Daria Yevgenyevna Serova (born 24 July 1982 in Kirovsk, Murmansk Oblast) is a Russian freestyle skier who specializes in the moguls discipline. She competed at the 2006 Winter Olympics and the 2010 Winter Olympics.

References

External links 

 Profile on sports-reference.com

1982 births
Living people
People from Kirovsk, Murmansk Oblast
Russian female freestyle skiers
Freestyle skiers at the 2006 Winter Olympics
Freestyle skiers at the 2010 Winter Olympics
Olympic freestyle skiers of Russia
Sportspeople from Murmansk Oblast